The 1938 WANFL season was the 54th season of the Western Australian National Football League, and saw Claremont, under champion coach Johnny Leonard who had transferred from West Perth, win its first premiership after losing two Grand Finals and drawing the first one this season. The blue and golds were to win the following two premierships before a long period near the foot of the ladder after Claremont Oval was gutted by a fire in 1944.

1938 also saw triple Brownlow Medallist Haydn Bunton senior, enticed by the offer of employment, move to Subiaco and win the first of three Sandovers in only four seasons in Perth; however his presence overshadowed the rest of the team and the Maroons were to advance only one place compared to 1937, being handicapped by the loss of champion defender Lou Daily to the Goldfields where he led Mines Rovers to several premierships. West Perth, who under Leonard and Jack Cashman had won three premierships earlier in the decade, had a disastrous time and finished the season with twelve consecutive losses despite the brilliant form of goalsneak Ted Tyson, who set numerous records in the final round and finished as leading goalkicker.

Swan Districts, in a last promising season before descending for two decades to the status of perennial easybeats, achieved a notable feat in becoming the first club to hold George Doig and then Ted Tyson goalless during a match.

A number of notable club tours took place during July, with mid-table VFL club St. Kilda touring Albany, Kalgoorlie and Perth, whilst East Fremantle embarked on a lengthy tour of the Eastern States and Perth made a shorter tour of rural Western Australia. Old Easts’ tour saw them lose narrowly to a team from Broken Hill but convincingly defeat a local team from Sydney the following week and a combined St. Kilda/Melbourne team by forty-three points in Victoria on the last Saturday of July.

Home-and-away season

Round 1

Round 2

Round 3

Round 4

Round 5

Round 6

Round 7

Round 8 (Foundation Day)

Round 9

Round 10

Round 11

Round 12

Round 13

St. Kilda Tour Match

Round 14 (Labour Day)

Round 15 (Easter Monday)

Round 16

Round 17

Round 18

Round 19

Round 20

Ladder

Finals

First semi-final

Second semi-final

Preliminary final

Grand Final

Grand Final replay

Notes
Until the end of July, East Fremantle had played two extra games and East Perth and Perth one extra game to allow Old Easts to tour the eastern states that month.

References

External links
Official WAFL site
Western Australian National Football League (WANFL) 1938

West Australian Football League seasons
WANFL season